Cornville may refer to a place in the United States:

Cornville, Arizona
Cornville, Maine